Andreas Weber may refer to:

 Andreas Weber (swimmer) (born 1953), German swimmer
 Andreas Weber (writer) (born 1967), German biologist and philosopher